The National Association of Japan–America Societies, Inc. (NAJAS) is a private, non-profit, non-partisan organization located in Washington, D.C. that offers educational, cultural and business programs about Japan and U.S.–Japan relations to the public through its member Japan and Japan–America Societies. NAJAS is the only national non-profit network in the United States dedicated to public education about Japan. NAJAS consists of approximately 40 independent Japan-related organizations located in 32 cities around the country. Its membership includes business, political, and academic, as well as American and Japanese members, and affords a variety of perspectives on U.S.–Japan relations.

See also
Japan Society (Manhattan)
Japan America Society of Greater Philadelphia
Japan America Society of Houston

References

External links
National Association of Japan–America Societies
Japan–America Societies in the U.S.
Japan–America Societies in Japan

Community-building organizations
International cultural organizations
Japanese-American culture in Washington, D.C.
Cultural organizations based in Japan
Japan–United States relations
Non-profit organizations based in Washington, D.C.